The 1974 UC Davis Aggies football team represented the University of California, Davis as a member of the Far Western Conference (FWC) during the 1974 NCAA Division II football season. Led by fifth-year head coach Jim Sochor, UC Davis compiled an overall record of 9–1 with a mark of 5–0 in conference play, winning the FWC title for the fourth consecutive season. 1973 was the fifth consecutive winning season for the Aggies. With the 5–0 conference record, they stretched their conference winning streak to eight games dating back to the previous season. The team outscored its opponents 297 to 143 for the season. The Aggies played home games at Toomey Field in Davis, California.

Schedule

References

UC Davis
UC Davis Aggies football seasons
Northern California Athletic Conference football champion seasons
UC Davis Aggies football